Zhuhai–Zhuhai Airport intercity railway, also known as the Zhuji intercity railway, is a regional railway in Zhuhai. The Phase 1 runs from Zhuhai railway station to Zhuhai Changlong railway station, while Phase 2 will terminate at Zhuhai Jinwan Airport. It is operated by China Railway Guangzhou Group. The railway is an extension of the Guangzhou–Zhuhai intercity railway.

Phase 1 started operation on 18 August 2020 (except ).

In November 2022, construction of the main structure of Hezhou South Station was completed.

Stations

References

Rail transport in Guangdong
Zhuhai
Railway lines opened in 2020
Railway lines in China